Woodson Farmstead was a historic agricultural property located off of Three Bridges Road near the intersection of South Carolina Highway 153 in Powdersville, South Carolina. It consisted of an early twentieth century fruit and pecan grove, a ca. 1875 well house and cotton house and a farmhouse built in 1895. The property was originally purchased in 1850 by William Woodson, who sold the property to his nephew, James Allen Woodson in 1892. It is listed on the National Register of Historic Places (NRHP).

In 1895, James Woodson commissioned Washington, D.C.-based builder John O. Scheck to design and construct his farmhouse. Unlike a typical farmhouse in the region, the two-story house was built with Eastlake and Queen Anne ornamentation including stained glass windows and an elaborately detailed porch.

The farmhouse was the last building standing and it was demolished in 2011. However, the farmstead has not been delisted from the NRHP as of November 13, 2013.

References

National Register of Historic Places in Anderson County, South Carolina
Houses completed in 1895
Houses on the National Register of Historic Places in South Carolina
Demolished buildings and structures in South Carolina
Victorian architecture in South Carolina
1890s establishments in South Carolina
Houses in Anderson County, South Carolina
Buildings and structures demolished in 2011